Astrakhan Kremlin is a fortress in Astrakhan, Russia. It is located on a hill on an island in the Volga Delta, between the Volga, the  Kutum, and the Tsarev.

About

For centuries, the Astrakhan Kremlin was inapproachable stronghold in the south-eastern border of Russia. A series of historical events are related to the fortress: the Crimean Turkish hiking on the lower Volga in the 16th century, the " Troubles " in Russia and the peasant uprising led by Stepan Razin in the 17th century, the transformation of the tsar Peter the Great Period, revolt of archers in 1705-1706, development of the Caspian navy in the 18th century, the reinforcement of the country's borders and entry into a part of Russian territories of the Caucasus and Central Asia.

In 1552, Tsar Ivan IV conquered the Kazan Khanate. Four years later, Russian troops took Astrakhan. When the Middle and Lower Volga Region was joined, Moscow department acquired access to the Caspian Sea, in the new lands began to emerge and strengthen the Russian city.

The first construction of the Kremlin began in 1587- 1588 under the guidance of sapper, a lector of Discharge Order – I.G. Vorodkov. He laid the first wooden fortress with powerful solid walls and towers. The place of construction was chosen on the hill, known as “Rabbit” or “Zayachii” in Russian. It was definitely the best place to build the fortress, because from the west and the north the hill was surrounded by the Volga River, and south and east – by lakes and marshes.

During the reign of Ivan IV The Terrible and Boris Godunov the wooden fortress was rebuilt into a stone one. For the development of Kremlin walls and towers state-owned official masters were headed from Moscow to Astrakhan. The chiefs of creation and planning of stone fortress were Mikhail Ivanovich Veliyaminov, Grigorii Ovcin and lecturer Dei Gubastii. For best results executives used the old, but very strong Tatar plinths which were brought from the ruins of the cities of the Golden Horde towns. Stone citadel was built by the type of Moscow Kremlin.

History

Construction and early history
The walls of the Astrakhan Kremlin were equipped with prongs the slots of which allowed to fire from handguns against enemies. At the same place at the top tier were formed "Varnitsa"—holes through which boiled water or hot tar was poured on attackers. During those times the system of organization of “fire fighting” of the fortress was invoked as one of the most modern systems in whole Russia. 
Construction of Assumption Cathedral, which began in 1699 on the first of October, was probably the most significant event that was held on the territory of the Astrakhan Kremlin. Thirty professional stonemasons were invited led by bondman architect Dorotheos Myakisheva. Building of the Cathedral lasted almost 12 years. During this time, the architects created the temple with proper cubic form with five heads. The external of the Cathedral was decorated with molded brick and carved with white stone. Windows and dome heads were framed by columns in the style of Corinthian décor and semicircular arches were filled with paintings with biblical plot. Three of such arches were arranged on each side of the temple.

The cathedral was divided into two floors: the upper church is dedicated to the honor of the Assumption of the Blessed Virgin. Tall and light temple was intended for ceremonial worships during warm months. The lower church which is dark lightened and surrounded by the gallery columns.

In 1710 the bell tower cathedral was constructed under the control of architect Dorothea Myakisheva. In addition to bells, the watch was also installed, which created freshness and uniqueness in the city.
The next two centuries were relatively calm for the Kremlin. Its buildings were repaired, rebuilt and renewed.

Twentieth century
At the beginning of the 20th century, after the October Revolution, access to the Territory of Kremlin was closed. Instead it was transformed as a military post, where groups of Red Guards were formed the Military Revolutionary Committee was placed.

In January 1918 Astrakhan Kremlin was once again in the middle of fateful events, when supporters of Soviet power fought with Astrakhan Cossacks. They attacked The Red Army that was entrenched in the Kremlin, from the roofs of nearby buildings. Serious destruction was caused to the Kremlin after this battle. Miraculously the temples of Kremlin have survived. In 1919 the Army was reorganized under the leadership of Kirov to protect the outfall of Volga and to defeat the White Guard troops and foreign interventionists. Thus, in the early 20th century the Kremlin remained a military target. It was popularly named as “The Town of Trotsky” (in 1992-1926). Only after the end of World War II did the town open access to the Kremlin. At the same time, the Kremlin ceased to be subject of military purposes. In the middle of the 20th century, significant restoration works were held, due to which many buildings, requiring urgent repairs were saved.

Museum
In 1974 the Astrakhan Kremlin became a museum and in 1980 became part of the Astrakhan State United Historical-Architectural Museum-Reserve. Nowadays citizens and tourists of Astrakhan have access to museum exhibits of the lifestyle of the Astrakhan Garrison. Moreover, they can see Casual Suits archers and scorers, elements of their weapons and ammunition, the exhibition dedicated to the history of popular uprisings and corporal punishment. In 2011, after the restoration of the Kremlin, the Guardhouse exposition was opened, which tells visitors about the life of Astrakhan military garrison of the 19th century.

Plan

 Walls of Kremlin, 1582—1589
 The cathedral bell tower with Prechistinsky Gate  (Пречистенские ворота), 1910—1912
 Archbishop Tower  (Архиерейская башня), 1812—1813
 Zhitnyaya Tower (Житная Башня), 1582—1589
 Crimean Tower (Крымская Башня), 1582—1589
 'Red Gate' Tower (Башня «Красные Ворота»)
 Water Gate (Ворота Водяные)
 St. Nicholas Church Gate (Никольская Надвратная Церковь), 1729—1738
 Artillery Tower and Yard (now it is museum with the same name), 1582—1589
 Cathedral of the Assumption, 1698—1710
 Trinity Cathedral with the churches of the Presentation of the Lord and the Introduction in Virgin Mary Church, House of Holy Trinity Monastery, 1602—1605
 Cyril's Chapel (Кирилловская часовня), 1677
 Archbishop's (Metropolitan's) House and the Church of Savior
 House of Clergy, 1622—1624
 Place of execution, 1710-1711
 Officer’s houses, 1805
 Soldier's Barracks, 1805
 Administrative housing (now it is a museum of the culture and life of the peoples of the Astrakhan region from the 18th to the 20th centuries.)

References

External links 
 Historical and architectural complex "Astrakhan Kremlin" 
Architecture and History of Kremlin 
Astrakhan Kremlin Museum 
Unesco 
Astrakhan-Musei.ru 
Culture.ru 

Kremlins
Astrakhan
Buildings and structures in Astrakhan Oblast
Museums in Astrakhan Oblast
World Heritage Tentative List
Cultural heritage monuments in Astrakhan Oblast
Objects of cultural heritage of Russia of federal significance